Smith County is a county in the U.S. state of Texas. As of the 2020 census, its population was 233,479. Its county seat is Tyler. Smith County is named for James Smith, a general during the Texas Revolution.

Smith County is part of the Tyler metropolitan statistical area and the Tyler–Jacksonville combined statistical area.

History 

For thousands of years, indigenous peoples occupied this area of present-day Texas. The first known inhabitants of the area now known as Smith County were the Caddo Indians, who were recorded here until 1819. That year, a band of Cherokee, led by The Bowl (also known as Chief Bowles), migrated from Georgia and settled in what are now Smith and Rusk counties. The Treaty of Bowles Village on February 23, 1836, between the Republic of Texas and the Cherokee and 12 affiliated tribes, gave all of Smith and Cherokee counties, as well as parts of western Rusk County, southern Gregg (formed from Rusk County in 1873) and southeastern Van Zandt counties to the tribes. 

Native Americans remained on these lands until the Cherokee War in the summer of 1839, as part of European-American conflicts with Native Americans in Texas. The Cherokee were driven out of Smith County. In this period, Cherokee and other Native American nations were  forced from the Southeast United States to west of the Mississippi River to Indian Territory during Indian Removal.

After 1845, some Cherokee returned when Benjamin Franklin Thompson, a white man married to a Cherokee, purchased 10,000 acres of land in Rusk County and allowed them to settle. The Mount Tabor Indian Community developed here, some six miles south of present-day Kilgore. The community later grew and incorporated areas near Overton, Arp, and Troup, Texas.

In July 1846, Smith County separated from the Nacogdoches District and was named for James Smith, a general of the Texas Revolution. At this time, Tyler was designated as the county seat.

Camp Fanin, a World War II US army replacement training facility, was located in the area known as Owentown, northeast of Tyler along US Hwy 271. Many of its original buildings still exist.

During the [[American Civil War, Camp Ford was the largest Confederate prisoner-of-war camp west of the Mississippi River. Here, Sheriff Jim Reed of Collin County and Judge McReynolds, former chief justice of the district, were seized and lynched by "Regulators". 

The original site of the camp stockade is now a public historic park, owned by Smith County, and managed by the Smith County Historical Society. The park contains a kiosk, a paved trail, interpretive signage, a cabin reconstruction, and a picnic area. It is located on Highway 271, 0.8 miles north of Loop 323.

20th century to present
The Smith County Historical Society, a 501(c)(3) nonprofit organization, was founded in 1959 by individuals and business firms dedicated to discovering, collecting, and preserving data, records, and other items relating to the history of Smith County. More information can be found at the Smith County Historical Society Website.

Geography

Major highways

  Interstate 20
  U.S. Highway 69
  U.S. Highway 80
  U.S. Highway 271
  State Highway 31
  State Highway 57
  State Highway 64
  State Highway 110
  State Highway 135
  State Highway 155
   Loop 49
  Loop 323

Adjacent counties
 Wood County (north)
 Upshur County (northeast)
 Gregg County (east)
 Rusk County (southeast)
 Cherokee County (south)
 Henderson County (southwest)
 Van Zandt County (northwest)

Communities

Cities 

 Arp
 Hideaway
 Lindale
 New Chapel Hill
 Noonday
 Overton (mostly in Rusk County)
 Troup (small part in Cherokee County)
 Tyler (county seat)
 Whitehouse

Towns 
 Bullard (small part in Cherokee County)
 Winona

Census-designated place 
 Emerald Bay

Unincorporated communities 

 Antioch
 Bascom
 Blackjack
 Bostick
 Browning
 Carroll
 Copeland
 Dogwood City
 Elberta
 Flint
 Garden Valley
 Gresham
 Jamestown
 Lee Spring
 Midway
 Mount Sylvan
 New Harmony
 New Hope
 Omen
 Owentown
 Pine Springs
 Pine Trail Estates
 Red Springs
 Salem
 Sand Flat
 Shady Grove
 Sinclair City
 Starrville
 Swan
 Teaselville
 Thedford
 Walnut Grove
 Waters Bluff
 Wood Springs
 Wright City

Ghost towns 
 Burning Bush
 Douglas
 Utica

Demographics

Note: the US Census treats Hispanic/Latino as an ethnic category. This table excludes Latinos from the racial categories and assigns them to a separate category. Hispanics/Latinos can be of any race.

In the 2010 U.S. census, Smith County had a population of 209,714, up from its 1850 population of 4,292. By the 2020 census, its population increased to 233,479. Among its population in 2010, the racial and ethnic makeup was 62.11% non-Hispanic white, 17.74% Black or African American, 0.35% American Indian or Alaska Native, 1.22% Asian alone, 0.03% Native Hawaiian or other Pacific Islander, 0.11% some other race, 3.47% multiracial, and 17.21% Hispanic or Latino of any race. In 2020, its racial and ethnic makeup was 57.59% non-Hispanic white, 16.28% Black or African American, 0.32% American Indian or Alaska Native, 1.77% Asian alone, 0.03% Native Hawaiian or other Pacific Islander, 0.30% some other race, 3.47% multiracial and 20.25% Hispanic or Latino of any race; 2020's census statistics reflected state and nationwide demographic trends of greater diversification within the U.S. overall.

At the 2021 American Community Survey, Smith County had a median household income of $63,115; its mean household income was $86,661. Among the owner-occupied housing units of the county, the median value was $169,600, and there was a median real estate tax of $2,634. Owner-occupied housing units without a mortgage had a median value of $173,700 and median real estate tax of $2,203. Throughout the county, an estimated 12.51% of the population lived at or below the poverty line.

Politics
Conservative Whites in Smith County began to ally with the Republican Party in 1952, also making it one of three East Texas counties, along with Panola and Gregg, to vote for Barry Goldwater in 1964, when native son Democratic President Lyndon B. Johnson won re-election. At that time, most Blacks and Latinos in the county were still disenfranchised due to the state's discriminatory use of certain barriers. The last Democrat to carry Smith County was incumbent President Harry S. Truman in 1948. No Democrat has gained 30% of the county's vote in the past six elections. The last Democrat to gain more than 40% was Jimmy Carter from Georgia in 1976.

Smith County is represented in the Texas House of Representatives by Matt Schaefer (R) of Tyler and the Texas Senate by Senator Bryan Hughes (R). Its U.S. Representative is Nathaniel Moran (R).

Government and infrastructure
The county is governed by a Commissioners Court, made up of four members elected from single-member districts and a county judge elected at-large.

Smith County ranks 10th in the State of Texas for road miles. The county has 1,170 miles – about the distance from Tyler, Texas to Paradise, Nevada -- of roads it maintains. The Smith County Road & Bridge Department maintains the county's bridges and roads, including mowing the rights of way.

The $39.5 million Smith County Road Bond passed with 73% of the vote on November 7, 2017. The issuance of bonds was for road and bridge construction and major improvements. Road work around the county is well underway. For a list of road projects in the two-phase, six-year bond program, visit www.smith-county.com.

Officials
Twenty-eight elected officials serve Smith County citizens (county auditor is not an elected position):

Education
These school districts serve school-aged children in Smith County:
 Arp Independent School District
 Bullard Independent School District (also partially in Cherokee County)
 Chapel Hill Independent School District
 Gladewater Independent School District (also partially in Gregg County and Upshur County)
 Lindale Independent School District (also partially in Van Zandt County)
 Troup Independent School District (also partially in Cherokee County)
 Tyler Independent School District
 Van Independent School District (also partially in Van Zandt County)
 Whitehouse Independent School District
 Winona Independent School District

Those wishing to attend institutions of higher learning in the area can attend:
 Tyler Junior College
 Texas College
 University of Texas at Tyler
 The University of Texas Health Science Center at Tyler

Media
Smith County is part of the Tyler/Longview/Jacksonville DMA. Local media outlets are: KLTV, KTRE-TV, KYTX-TV, KFXK-TV, KCEB-TV, and KETK-TV.

KTBB, an AM radio station based in Tyler, provides a news-talk format to the area.

The daily Tyler Morning Telegraph is the primary newspaper in the county, based in Tyler. Coverage of the area can also be found in the Longview News-Journal, published in Longview, in Gregg County.

See also

 Caldwell Zoo
 Carnegie History Center
 Cotton Belt Depot Train Museum
 Goodman-LeGrand House
 List of museums in East Texas
 National Register of Historic Places listings in Smith County, Texas
 Recorded Texas Historic Landmarks in Smith County
 Texas Rose Festival
 Tyler Museum of Art
 Whitaker-McClendon House

References

External links
 Smith County official website
 Smith County Historical Society

 
1846 establishments in Texas
Populated places established in 1846